Holy See–Philippines relations refers to the relations between the Holy See and the Philippines. As one of two Catholic-majority countries in Asia (the other being Timor-Leste), the Philippines enjoys significant relations with the Holy See. The Holy See has a nunciature in Manila,
and the Philippines has an embassy to the Holy See (Vatican City) based in Rome.

History

Catholicism first arrived in the Philippines in the 16th century, with missionaries accompanying conquistadors as they annexed the islands to the Spanish Empire. By the time the Philippines regained sovereignty from the United States following the Second World War with the establishment of the Third Republic, Catholicism had already left a lasting impression on Philippine culture and society with at least seventy percent of Filipinos professing the faith.

During the administration of Philippine President Elpidio Quirino, the Apostolic Delegation of the Philippines was upgraded to a Nunciature, with Archbishop Egidio Vagnozzi becoming the first Apostolic Nuncio on 9 April 1951. The first Philippine Ambassador to the Holy See, Dr Manuel Moran, presented his credentials to Pope Pius XII on 4 June 1951.

Three popes thus far have made pastoral visits to the Philippines. Pope Paul VI visited the Philippines in 1970 and made a speech in front of students at the University of Santo Tomas (UST) in Manila. In 1981, Pope John Paul II also gave a speech at UST, and beatified the 17th century Manila native Lorenzo Ruiz a saint at Luneta Park, the first beatification made outside the Vatican. The pontiff later returned the Philippines in 1995 for the X World Youth Day. On January 15–19, 2015, Pope Francis made a papal visit to the Philippines, where he gave a speech at UST and visited Tacloban, the city that was devastated by Typhoon Yolanda (Haiyan).

The Philippines has hosted the 1937 International Eucharistic Congress (IEC) in Manila and did so again from 25 to 31 January 2016, which was moved from the original May date per request of the Vatican. Archbishop of Cebu José S. Palma of the Catholic Bishops' Conference of the Philippines suggested to the Vatican for Pope Francis to visit the country for the event. However, Palma later confirmed that the pontiff would not visit the country for the event and the Vatican would instead send a papal envoy to participate, saying: "the IEC is the opportunity to give glory to God. Others are saying if the Pope comes people might come because of the Pope but not because of Jesus."

See also
Apostolic Nunciature to the Philippines
Christianity in the Philippines

References

 
Philippines
Bilateral relations of the Philippines